Western Sahara is a territory in Northern Africa, bordered by the North Atlantic Ocean, Morocco proper, Algeria (Tindouf region), and Mauritania.   Geographic coordinates:

Size
Total: , about the size of Colorado
land: 
water: 
 Coastline: 
 Land boundaries:  – Algeria: , Mauritania: , Morocco: 
 Saguia el-Hamra is the northern third with the city El Aaiún.
 Río de Oro is the southern two-thirds (south of Cape Bojador), with the city Dakhla.

The peninsula in the extreme southwest, with the city of Lagouira, is called Ras Nouadhibou, Cabo Blanco, or Cap Blanc. The eastern side is part of Mauritania.

Maritime claims: contingent upon resolution of sovereignty issue

Land

Terrain
The terrain is mostly low, flat desert with large areas of rocky or sandy surfaces rising to small mountains in south and northeast.

Elevation extremes:
Lowest point:  Sebjet Tah, a depression in the northwest part of Western Sahara straddling the Morocco border
Highest point: Unnamed elevation, east of Awsard (Aousserd)

Natural resources
Phosphates, iron ore, and fishing resources on Atlantic Ocean coast

Land use
Arable land: 0.02%
Permanent crops: 0%
Other: 99.98% (2005)

Irrigated land: N/A

Natural hazards
Hot, dry, dust/sand-laden sirocco wind can occur during winter and spring; widespread harmattan haze exists 60% of time, often severely restricting visibility. Flash flooding occurs during spring months.

Environment

Climate
Western Sahara has a hot desert climate (Köppen climate classification BWh). Annual average rainfall is below  everywhere. Along the Atlantic coast, averages high and low temperatures are constant and very moderated throughout the year because cool offshore ocean currents considerably cool off the climate, especially during the day. However, summertime is long and extremely hot and wintertime is short and very warm to truly hot further in the interior, where cooling marine influences aren't felt anymore. The sky is usually clear and bright throughout the year and sunny weather is the norm.

Current issues

Sparse water and lack of arable land.

Extreme points 

This is a list of the extreme points of Western Sahara, the points that are farther north, south, east or west than any other location.
 Northernmost points – the border with Morocco*
 Easternmost points – the northern section of the border with Mauritania/Algeria**
 Southernmost point – the southern tip of Ras Nouadhibou (Cabo Blanco/Cap Blanc)
 Westernmost point – Cape Dubouchage on Ras Nouadhibou
 Note: Western Sahara does not have a northernmost point, the border being formed by a circle of latitude
 Note: Western Sahara does not have an easternmost point, the border being formed by a meridian

References